In Major League Baseball (MLB), the 300 save club is the group of pitchers who have recorded 300 or more regular-season saves in their careers. Most commonly a relief pitcher ("reliever" or "closer") earns a save by being the final pitcher of a game in which his team is winning by three or fewer runs and pitching at least one inning without losing the lead. The final pitcher of a game can earn a save by getting at least one batter out to end the game with the winning run on base, at bat, or on deck, or by pitching the last three innings without relinquishing the lead, regardless of score.
The statistic was created by Jerome Holtzman in 1959 to "measure the effectiveness of relief pitchers" and was adopted as an official statistic by MLB in 1969. The save has been retroactively measured for past pitchers where applicable. Hoyt Wilhelm retired in 1972 and recorded just 31 saves from 1969 onwards, for example, but holds 228 total career saves.

The New York Mets are the only franchise to see three players reach the milestone while on their roster. They are John Franco, Billy Wagner, and most recently Jason Isringhausen. Mariano Rivera holds the MLB save record with 652. Only Rivera and Trevor Hoffman have exceeded 500 or 600 saves, and Hoffman was the first to achieve either. Rivera, Hoffman, Lee Smith, Francisco Rodríguez, John Franco, and Billy Wagner are the only pitchers to have recorded 400 or more saves. Rollie Fingers was the first player to record 300 saves, reaching the mark on August 21, 1982. Aroldis Chapman is the most recent, achieving his 300th on August 26, 2021. In total, 31 players have recorded 300 or more saves in their career. Only eight relievers – Dennis Eckersley, Fingers, Goose Gossage, Hoffman, Rivera, Smith, Bruce Sutter, and Wilhelm – have been inducted into the Baseball Hall of Fame; all but Wilhelm also have at least 300 saves.  Craig Kimbrel, Kenley Jansen, and Chapman are the only active players with more than 300 saves, and Kimbrel is the active leader with 394.

Key

List

Stats updated as of the end of the 2022 season.

See also

List of Major League Baseball annual saves leaders
List of Major League Baseball career games finished leaders
List of Major League Baseball career saves leaders

Notes

References
General

Specific

Major League Baseball lists
Major League Baseball statistics